The 2000 Sanyo Indonesia Open in badminton was held in Jakarta, from July 19 to July 23, 2000. It was a five-star tournament and the prize money was US$150,000.

Venue
Senayan

Final results

References
Smash: 2000 Indonesian Open

External links
 Tournament Link

Indonesia Open (badminton)
Indonesia
2000 in Indonesian sport
Sports competitions in Jakarta